Jose María Jiménez Sastre (February 6, 1971 in El Barraco, Spain - December 6, 2003 in Madrid) was a professional road bicycle racer. During his career he excelled as a climber, winning numerous mountain stages. His nickname was "El Chava".

Career
After a four month spell as a stagiaire (trainee), Jiménez turned professional at the beginning of the 1993 season with the Spanish team Banesto which he would be a part of for the rest of his career. In his first year, his teammates included Tour de France champions Pedro Delgado and Miguel Induráin. Even at an early point in his career, Jiménez was considered a potential successor of Induráin.

Vuelta a España
Jiménez was particularly successful in the Vuelta a España, winning nine stages in total, the points classification in 2001 and the mountains classification in 1997, 1998, 1999 and 2001. His four triumphs in the mountains classification of the Vuelta places him behind only José Luis Laguía as the rider with the most wins in the competition in the history of the race.

His best year in the Vuelta was 1998. Here, he took the overall lead for the first time in his career after winning stage 6. However, he acknowledged that the individual time trial on stage 9 would inevitably cost him the lead, as this was a weakness of his. As expected, Jiménez found himself just over three minutes down on his Banesto teammate Abraham Olano after the time trial. But Jiménez then won stages 10, 11 and 16, before finally taking back the overall lead from Olano with just two stages remaining. However, the following stage was another time trial in which he lost 2.50 to Olano and consequently the overall victory. Kelme rider Fernando Escartín also bested Jiménez by enough to knock him down into 3rd place overall, his final placing. Jiménez would never again lead the Vuelta. His second best overall performance was in 1999, in which he was 5th. Prior to that he was 12th in 1996 and 21st in 1997. He concluded his Vuelta career with three stage wins on his way to 17th place overall in 2001.

Other races
Of other noteworthy results, Jiménez won the Spanish National Road Race Championships in 1997 and secured overall victories in the 2000 Volta a Catalunya and in the Vuelta a La Rioja in both 1994 and 1997. He also competed in both of the other Grand Tours, the Tour de France and the Giro d'Italia. After a modest Giro d'Italia debut with 26th place in 1995, he was appointed leader of his Banesto team for the 1999 race and started off well by finishing 2nd after Marco Pantani on stage 8. However, a time trial and then a disastrous stage 14 followed, during which he lost over 20 minutes, making him drop to 38th overall. He eventually finished 33rd overall, never to return to the race.

He had more luck in his Tour de France starts, finishing 8th overall in 1997 after a consistent performance which included four top 10 results on individual stages. He also challenged for stage wins in the 2000 edition, managing 3rd on the mountainous stage 10 and 2nd on stage 15, only beaten by Marco Pantani. Nonetheless, he finished 23rd overall, some 52 minutes down on winner Lance Armstrong.

Style
Both on and off the bike, Jiménez was, with only a few exceptions, too erratic to ride consistently in stage races.

He often attacked without considering the consequences, which however sometimes resulted in spectacular wins in the toughest mountain stages. A particularly memorable instance of this occurred during stage eight of the 1999 Vuelta a España. Jiménez attacked the 23% gradient of the Angliru in rain and fog to catch Pavel Tonkov's long solo break at the line and take the stage in a two-man sprint. As he crossed the line, he did not have the energy for the victory pose. It was the first time in the history of the race that the Angliru was used. However, he would subsequently pay for his attacking style in the next stage, where he would often lose by 10 or more minutes.

Death
Jiménez received psychological treatment for depression, and retired from professional cycling in 2002, at which point he got married. He died of a heart attack in a psychiatric hospital in Madrid at the age of 32, in December 2003.

Spanish cyclist Carlos Sastre is Jiménez's brother-in-law. He dedicated his victory in the 2008 Tour de France to Jiménez.

Career achievements

Major results

1992
 1st  Overall Circuito Montañés
1993
 3rd Subida al Naranco
 5th Subida a Urkiola
1994
 1st  Overall Vuelta a La Rioja
1st Stage 2a
 1st Subida a Urkiola
 3rd Prueba Villafranca de Ordizia
 10th Subida al Naranco
1995
 1st  Overall Colorado Classic
1st Stages 1 & 3
 2nd Overall Vuelta a La Rioja
 2nd Road race, National Road Championships
 9th Subida al Naranco
 10th Overall Tour of the Basque Country
 10th Overall Volta a Catalunya
1st Stage 4 
1996
 1st Subida a Urkiola
 1st  Mountains classification Vuelta a Burgos
 9th Overall Setmana Catalana de Ciclisme
1997
 1st  National Road Race Championship
 1st  Overall Vuelta a La Rioja
1st Stage 2
 Vuelta a España
 1st  Mountains classification 
1st Stage 19
 2nd Subida al Naranco
 2nd Subida a Urkiola
 3rd Classique des Alpes
 5th Overall Vuelta a Asturias
 8th Overall Tour de France
1998
 2nd Overall Vuelta a Asturias
1st Stage 5 
 3rd Overall Vuelta a España
1st  Mountains classification
1st Stages 6, 10, 11 & 16
 5th Overall Critérium du Dauphiné Libéré
1st  Mountains classification 
1st  Combination classification
1st Stage 3
 7th Overall Vuelta a Burgos
1st  Mountains classification
 9th Overall Route d'Occitanie
1999
 2nd Overall Vuelta a Aragón
 3rd Overall Volta a Catalunya
 3rd Subida a Urkiola
 5th Overall Vuelta a España
1st  Mountains classification
1st Stage 8
 8th Overall Vuelta a Burgos
2000
 1st  Overall Volta a Catalunya
1st Stages 7 & 8 (ITT)
 1st Classique des Alpes
2001
 Vuelta a España
1st  Points classification
1st  Mountains classification
1st Stages 8, 11 & 12 (ITT)
 2nd Subida a Urkiola
 3rd Overall Vuelta a La Rioja

Grand Tour general classification results timeline

References

External links 
Profile by world-of-cycling.com
Palmarès by memoire-du-cyclisme.net 

1971 births
2003 deaths
Spanish male cyclists
Spanish Vuelta a España stage winners
Sportspeople from the Province of Ávila
Cyclists from Castile and León